Gubernatorial elections in 1999 took place in 16 regions of the Russian Federation.

In 1999, the tenures of the governors of 12 provinces, elected in 1995, expired. An early election was held in Leningrad Oblast, year after resignation of Vadim Gustov. The first direct elections for the Head of Karachay-Cherkessia also took place that year.

In the last two parliamentary republics, Dagestan and Udmurtia, direct elections have not come any closer: in Dagestan, the referendum on the introduction of the presidency was held in the summer of 1999, with the majority voting against; and in Udmurtia, a new State Council was elected and its chairman Alexander Volkov was re-elected.

Race summary

Karachay-Cherkessia 
In April and May 1999, elections were held for the head of Karachay-Cherkessia. The mayor of Cherkessk Stanislav Derev received 43.1% of the vote in the first round, surpassing former Commander-in-Chief of the Russian Ground Forces general Vladimir Semyonov, with 17.9% of the vote. After the first round, confrontation started to arise between the frontrunners. The rivalry of Semyonov and Derev was viewed as a confrontation between the Karachays and Circassians.

On the morning of May 16, the roads to areas with Karachay majority or mixed Karachay-Russian population were blocked by the police and OMON. By Derev's order, more than 60 polling stations were closed in Cherkessk, although later, through the efforts of the CEC, voting began in most of them. Semyonov received 75.5% of the vote, with about 18.6% for Derev. After the second round, Derev's supporters organized a rally in the center of Cherkessk, demanding the annulling of the falsified election results.

On May 19, after negotiations in Moscow, Derev stated that he was demanding either the cancellation of the election results, or the secession of Cherkessia. At the same time, he applied to the Supreme Court of Russia and the Central Election Commission with a request to cancel the results of the second round. On May 24, after the visit of the Prime Minister of Russia Sergey Stepashin to Cherkessk, the head of Karachay-Cherkessia Vladimir Khubiyev resigned. Igor Ivanov, chairman of the People's Assembly of Karachay-Cherkessia, was appointed as the interim head of the region.

In July, the Supreme Court of the KChR recognized the results of the elections; later, this decision was overturned by the Supreme Court of Russia. In late August 1999, the republican court reaffirmed the results of the vote on May 16. On September 14, Semyonov took office as head of the republic, which marked the end of the conflict.

Sverdlovsk Oblast

Moscow City 
In June 1999 the Moscow City Duma decided to move the 2000 mayoral election six months ahead of schedule. The new voting day was set on 19 December 1999, when the elections to the 3rd State Duma of Russia were to take place.

On September 17, the incumbent mayor of Moscow Yury Luzhkov officially announced his intention to run for re-election, naming Valery Shantsev as his candidate for the vice mayor. Opposition, represented by the Union of Right Forces, nominated former prime minister of Russia Sergey Kiriyenko. Luzhkov surpassed him by more than 58%. Two thirds of the voters came to the polling stations in Moscow on December 19.

Moscow Oblast 
Gubernatorial election in Moscow Oblast was held on 19 December 1999, in parallel with the federal legislative election. The peculiarity of this campaign was that the candidates for the governor were running along with the candidates for the vice-governor (this office will be abolished in 2002). The Fatherland – All Russia party (OVR), realizing low chances to win for incumbent governor Anatoly Tyazhlov, authorized the nomination of Soviet Army general Boris Gromov. That is, OVR had two candidates for governor at once. On 9 January 2000, Boris Gromov was elected governor of Moscow Oblast in the second round of the election.

Notes

References

Gubernatorial elections in Russia
1999 elections in Russia